Mount Heg is a massive ice-covered mountain forming the south end of a promontory on the west side of Malta Plateau (named after the island of Malta) in Victoria Land, Antarctica. It is bounded on the west, south, and east sides by Seafarer Glacier, Mariner Glacier and Potts Glacier. The mountain first appeared in 1960 on the New Zealand map compiled from U.S. Navy aerial photographs. It was so named by the Advisory Committee on Antarctic Names in 1972 for James E. Heg, Chief of the Polar Planning and Coordination Staff in the Office of Polar Programs, National Science Foundation. This topographical feature lies situated on the Pennell Coast, a portion of Antarctica lying between Cape Williams and Cape Adare.

References

Mountains of Victoria Land
Pennell Coast